Fudge is a 1995–1997 American children's television series based on a series of Judy Blume books about a young boy nicknamed Fudge. The series ran for two seasons (1995–1997), with 24 episodes following a telefilm adaptation of Blume's novel Fudge-a-Mania, which aired on January 7, 1995 in primetime. Fudge premiered on ABC in January 1995, and switched to CBS for its second season. TV Guide twice listed Fudge as one of the Ten Best Shows for Children. The show was canceled in 1997. At the Seventeenth Annual Youth in Film Awards, the cast was nominated for a Young Actors Award, Best Performance by a Young Ensemble: Television.  Nassira Nicola, who played Sheila Tubman, won for Best Performance by a Young Actress: TV Comedy Series.

Cast
 Jake Richardson as Peter Warren Hatcher (storyteller)
 Luke Tarsitano as Farley Drexel "Fudge" Hatcher
 Nassira Nicola as Sheila Tubman
 Alex Burrall as Jimmy Fargo
 Nick Humphrey as Elliot
 Brenda Song as Jennie
 Teddy Dale as Sam
 Jared Moen as Daniel Manheim
 Eve Plumb as Anne Hatcher ("Mom")
 Forrest Witt as Warren Hatcher ("Dad")
 Rob Monroe as Henry

Episodes

TV movie

Season 1 (1995)

Season 2 (1995)

References

External links
 

1990s American children's television series
1990s American sitcoms
1995 American television series debuts
1997 American television series endings
American Broadcasting Company original programming
American children's television sitcoms
CBS original programming
American television shows based on children's books
Television shows based on American novels
Fudge series
Television series by Amblin Entertainment
Television series by Universal Television
Television shows set in New York City
Television series about children
Television series about families